Pola Kinski (born Pola Nakszynski; 23 March 1952) is a German actress. She is the firstborn daughter of the German actor Klaus Kinski.

Early life

Under the name Pola Nakszynski, Pola Kinski was born in Berlin as the only daughter of German actor Klaus Kinski and his first wife, the singer Gislinde Kühlbeck. After her father changed his surname to Kinski, it was changed for his children as well.

Her parents divorced in 1955 when she was three years old. Pola was brought up by her mother and grandfather in Munich and saw her father only on irregular basis. As soon as he became a famous actor, he would order his daughter to visit him in Berlin and later in Rome, as well as on film sets. He alternated between fits of rage and showering her with money and extravagant presents. 

Her mother remarried and had a second child with her husband Herbert Kuhlbeck. Her father remarried twice and had a child with each of his wives. Pola is the half sister of the German actress Nastassja Kinski (born 1961) and the French-American actor Nikolai Kinski (born 1976). The half-siblings spent little time together while growing up.

Autobiography
The German title of Kinski's autobiography, The Mouth of a Child, 2013, refers to the original title of her father's memoirs All I Need Is Love (or I am so wild about your strawberry mouth), first published in 1975.

She gives personal account of what it was like to be the daughter of the extravagant enfant terrible of German cinema, Klaus Kinski. She describes him forcing her into an incestuous relationship, while her mother claimed not to have noticed.
Klaus was dead for more than 20 years when Pola described him and his actions from her perspective. A Sunday Times book review describes him as being "furiously intense, disturbingly charismatic, emotionally extravagant — [he] overwhelmed her with attention. He gave her expensive gifts, dressed her in the most beautiful clothes, flattered her with passionate compliments. Little Pola was always "My princess", "My baby doll", "My darling child", whom Kinski insisted he couldn't live a minute without. If they were apart, he might call her a dozen times a day."

According to Pola, the incestuous relationship was inflicted on her from the ages of 5 to 19.

Her younger sister Nastassja said "My sister is a heroine because she has freed her heart, her soul and also her future from the weight of the secret."

Career

In the early 1970s, Kinski studied acting at the Otto-Falckenberg-Schule in Munich. 

In addition to gaining early film roles, she acted at the Schauspielhaus Bochum and the Deutsches Schauspielhaus in Hamburg. In the 1970s she worked with Peter Zadek and the director Ivan Nagel. 

From 1977 onwards, Kinski worked as a freelance actor in German-language productions. She lived in Berlin and Paris. She has also appeared in several television films, including some produced in the early 2000s.

Marriage and family

She married Wolfgang Hoepner, a lawyer, and they live in Ludwigshafen. They have three children: Janina (born 1978), Valentin (born 1986) and Nanouk. Kinski is the aunt of American fashion model Kenya Kinski-Jones.

Filmography

1977: Das Ende der Beherrschung (TV)
1977: Fehlschuß (TV)
1978:  (Feature film)
1980: Ohne Rückfahrkarte (Film)
1980: Sunday Children (Film)
1981:  (TV)
1983: Das Dorf (TV)
1985: Ein Fall für zwei: Fluchtgeld (TV)
1986: Wanderungen durch die Mark Brandenburg (TV)
1987: Komplizinnen (TV)
2001: Bella Block: Bitterer Verdacht (TV)
2004: Tatort: Hundeleben  (TV)
2007: Wir werden uns wiederseh'n (Film)

References

External links

1952 births
Living people
Actresses from Berlin
German television actresses
German film actresses
20th-century German actresses
German people of Polish descent